Interbank is a Peruvian provider of financial services.

History

In 1897, Elias Mujica opened an agency at Jiron de la Union in Lima's historical center under the name of Banco Internacional. In 1934, branches were opened in Chiclayo and Arequipa, and later expansions included Piura, Sullana and other places in Peru.

Under the military government of Juan Velasco Alvarado, in 1970, the national bank (Banco de la Nacion) purchased Banco Internacional and changed its name to "Banca Asociada del Pais". Ten years later, under the democratic government of Fernando Belaunde Terry, the bank changed its name to InterBanc but it was still property of the Peruvian government.

In July 1994, Carlos Rodriguez-Pastor Sr. along with several North American businessmen purchased 91% of the bank's stocks. The new owners changed the name to Interbank.

Part of the expansion strategy at that point was to open agency branches in supermarkets so customers could shop and bank at the same time.

In 2004, Interbank bought the supermarket chain Supermercados Santa Isabel from the transnational Ahold, and they founded Supermercados Peruanos. They have offices inside Vivanda and Plaza Vea stores. Currently, Interbank has 230 branches, called "tiendas" or stores, over 1,500 ATMs, and over 1,500 Interbank Agentes in Peru.

In 2007, Interbank opened a business agency in Shanghai, China in order to facilitate negotiations between Chinese and Peruvians.

Luis Felipe Castellanos López-Torres holds the position of General Manager (CEO) since 2011.

Services
Interbank provides ATM services under the GlobalNet brand which accept debit and credit cards from around the world, as well as permitting cash deposits. Interbank also provides change machines which exchange notes for coins.

The bank has a corporate university belonging to the Intercorp Group called Interbank Corporate University, known as UCIC. This organization provides training services to the more than 20,000 employees of the Intercorp Group companies.

Utility bills can be paid at Interbank branches.

In popular culture
In the movie Don't Look Up, final post-credit scenes depict the owner of Interbank in a cryogenic sleep chamber, among other bourgeois billionaires, having survived the planet-killer comet that destroyed Earth. Having slept for over 70,000 years, the chambers are shown to start opening.

See also

Supermercados Peruanos
Cineplanet
GlobalNet

External links
Interbank

References 

Banks of Peru
Banks established in 1897
Companies based in Lima
Peruvian brands